The Burden of Proof, published in 1990, is Scott Turow's second novel, somewhat of a sequel to Presumed Innocent. The Burden of Proof follows the story of defense attorney Sandy Stern in the aftermath of his wife's death and the growing realization that there is much about his marriage that he has never understood.  Stern's bereavement coincides with his latest case, defending commodities broker Dixon Hartnell.  Hartnell is a complex figure, one that Sandy admires but doesn't trust.  Stern soon realizes that defending "Dix" will force him to tread a narrow path between zealous advocacy for a client and his ethical responsibilities to the courts.

The Burden of Proof is set in the fictional Midwestern Kindle County, Illinois, the setting of Turow's other novels, and features or refers to characters that appear in those other stories.

Miniseries

In 1991, a television miniseries based on the novel and bearing the same title was released starring Héctor Elizondo.

References

Kindle County
1990 American novels
Novels by Scott Turow
American novels adapted into films
Farrar, Straus and Giroux books

Legal thriller novels
Novels set in Illinois